The First Treaty of Constance was signed between the Emperor Frederick I and Pope Eugene III in 1153. By the terms of the treaty, the Emperor was to prevent any action by Manuel I Komnenos to reestablish the Byzantine Empire on Italian soil and to assist the pope against his enemies in revolt in Rome. In 1155, as part of the agreement securing his imperial coronation, Frederick reaffirmed the terms of Constance for Pope Adrian IV. The Second Treaty of Constance made peace between the Emperor and the Lombard League in 1183.

Sources
Norwich, John Julius. The Kingdom in the Sun 1130-1194. Longmans: London, 1970. 

1153
1153 in Europe
Constance
Constance
12th-century treaties